José María Martínez Sánchez-Arjona (7 February 1905 – 19 December 1977) was a Spanish politician who served as Minister of Housing between 1960 and 1969, during the Francoist dictatorship.

References

1905 births
1977 deaths
Housing ministers of Spain
Government ministers during the Francoist dictatorship